Charles Christison Sutherland (born 4 February 1898, date of death unknown) was a Scottish footballer who played as an inside left. He was born in Brechin, Scotland.

Career
Sutherland played for Third Lanark, Abercorn, Clydebank and St Mirren in Scotland. Sutherland joined Millwall in July 1920 and made his debut in their first ever League match. Alex Raisbeck signed Sutherland in August 1922 for Bristol City. Sutherland joined Merthyr Town in May 1926 along with Frank Vallis.

Honours
Football League Third Division South winner: 1922–23 with Bristol City.

References

1898 births
Year of death missing
People from Brechin
Scottish footballers
Association football forwards
English Football League players
Scottish Football League players
Third Lanark A.C. players
Abercorn F.C. players
Clydebank F.C. (1914) players
St Mirren F.C. players
Millwall F.C. players
Bristol City F.C. players
Merthyr Town F.C. players
Footballers from Angus, Scotland
Petershill F.C. players
Scottish Junior Football Association players